Pogonodaptus is a genus of beetles in the family Carabidae, containing the following species:

 Pogonodaptus mexicanus (Bates, 1878)
 Pogonodaptus rostratus Darlington, 1935

References

Harpalinae